During the 1984–85 English football season, Brentford competed in the Football League Third Division. The season is best remembered for the club's first appearance in a Football League Trophy final, which was lost 3–1 to Wigan Athletic.

Season summary 
Frank McLintock prepared for his first full season as Brentford manager by trimming his squad, releasing goalkeeper Paddy Roche, defenders Jim McNichol, Ian Bolton, Graham Wilkins and forward Tony Mahoney. His only significant signings were left back Jamie Murray from Cambridge United for £27,500 and centre back Steve Wignall from Colchester United for a £18,000 fee.

Manager McLintock presided over a season of transition in the Third Division, treading water in mid-table through to the end of 1984 and then dropping further in the early months of 1985. The goals of £20,000 signing Robbie Cooke allayed any fears that the club would be sucked into a relegation battle for the second successive season. The Bees repeated the previous season's feats in the League Cup and FA Cup, reaching the second and third rounds respectively. McLintock gave teenage defenders Keith Millen and Roger Joseph their debuts late in the season and both of whom would go on to become key players for the club. Brentford finished in 13th place in the Third Division.

Brentford's 1984–85 season is chiefly remembered for the club's run to the final of the Football League Trophy. The competition had been established in the 1982–83 season as the Football League Group Cup, but by 1984–85 the tournament had gained prestige, with sponsorship from Freight Rover and Wembley Stadium was announced as the venue for the final. The Bees won six matches in a row to reach the final, scoring 17 goals and conceding just three. The final was reached after an emphatic 6–0 Southern Area Final win over Newport County at Griffin Park, in which winger Gary Roberts scored four goals in a four-minute spell either side of half-time. The final versus Wigan Athletic at Wembley Stadium on 1 June 1985 was Brentford's first appearance at the ground since the 1942 London War Cup final. A disappointing defensive performance led to a 3–1 defeat, with Robbie Cooke scoring what proved to be the consolation goal.

Two club records were set or equalled during the season:
 Most Football League games without a clean sheet: 20 (29 September 1984 – 26 January 1985)
 Fastest hattrick (all competitions): 3 minutes – Gary Roberts (versus Newport County, Football League Trophy Southern Area final, 17 May 1985)

League table

Results
Brentford's goal tally listed first.

Legend

Pre-season

Football League Third Division

FA Cup

Football League Cup

Football League Trophy 

 Sources: 100 Years of Brentford, The Big Brentford Book of the Eighties, Statto

Playing squad 
Players' ages are as of the opening day of the 1984–85 season.

 Sources: The Big Brentford Book of the Eighties, Timeless Bees

Coaching staff

Statistics

Appearances and goals
Substitute appearances in brackets.

Players listed in italics left the club mid-season.
Source: The Big Brentford Book of the Eighties

Goalscorers 

Players listed in italics left the club mid-season.
Source: The Big Brentford Book of the Eighties

Management

Summary

Transfers & loans

Awards 
 Supporters' Player of the Year: Danis Salman
 Players' Player of the Year: Danis Salman

Notes

References 

Brentford F.C. seasons
Brentford